The 2017 Army Black Knights football team represented the United States Military Academy  as an independent in the 2017 NCAA Division I FBS football season. The Black Knights were led by fourth-year head coach Jeff Monken and played their home games at Michie Stadium finished the season 10–3, winning the Commander-in-Chief's Trophy for the first time since 1996 after sweeping service academy rivals Air Force and Navy. They were invited to the Armed Forces Bowl where they defeated San Diego State. Following the season, they were chosen as the 2017 ECAC Division I Football Subdivision Team of the Year.

Personnel

Roster

Coaching staff

Schedule

Game summaries

Fordham

Buffalo

at Ohio State

at Tulane

UTEP

at Rice

Eastern Michigan

Temple

at Air Force

Duke

at North Texas

vs. Navy

vs. San Diego State – Armed Forces Bowl

References

Army
Army Black Knights football seasons
Armed Forces Bowl champion seasons
Army Black Knights football